Christopher Guy Vere Davidge, of Little Houghton House, OBE DL (5 November 1929 – 22 December 2014) was a British rower who competed in the Summer Olympics three times in 1952, 1956 and 1960 and won the Silver Goblets at Henley Royal Regatta three times.

Biography
Davidge was born in Northampton, son of Cecil Vere Davidge and Ursula Catherine Smyth, and the grandson of Cecil William Davidge. He was educated at Eton College and Trinity College, Oxford and rowed in the Oxford boat in the 1949 Boat Race. He returned to stroke Oxford in the 1951 Boat Race, when the Oxford boat sank, and the race was rerun on the following Monday. He was in the winning Oxford crew in the 1952 race and umpired the 1971 and 1975 races.

In 1952 Davidge competed for Great Britain, rowing at the 1952 Summer Olympics in Helsinki. He was in the coxless pair with David Callender and came fourth. In 1955 Davidge was runner-up partnering J A Gobbo in the Silver Goblets at Henley Royal Regatta to the Russians Buldakov and Ivanov. In 1956 he competed for Great Britain rowing at the 1956 Summer Olympics where he was a member of the unplaced eight. He won the Silver Goblets at Henley in 1957 and 1958, partnering Tony Leadley. In 1959 he switched to the double sculls and won the Double Sculls Challenge Cup at Henley partnering Stuart Mackenzie and beating George Justicz and Nicholas Birkmyre. Davidge competed for Great Britain again rowing at the 1960 Summer Olympics. He was in the coxless four with Michael Beresford, Colin Porter, and John Vigurs, coming fifth.

Davidge represented England and won a gold medal at the 1962 British Empire and Commonwealth Games in the coxless four with Michael Clay, John Beveridge and John Tilbury. In 1963 Davidge won Silver Goblets again, this time partnering Stuart Mackenzie. Davidge later served as President of the Leander Club. Davidge was also awarded an OBE "for services to Rowing". He died on 22 December 2014, aged 85.

He was High Sheriff of Northamptonshire in 1988, following his father Cecil Vere Davidge, who was High Sheriff in 1950. On 14 March 1994 he was appointed Deputy Lieutenant of Northamptonshire.

See also
List of Oxford University Boat Race crews

References
Bibliography

Notes

1929 births
2014 deaths
Sportspeople from Northampton
English male rowers
British male rowers
Olympic rowers of Great Britain
Rowers at the 1952 Summer Olympics
Rowers at the 1956 Summer Olympics
Rowers at the 1960 Summer Olympics
Stewards of Henley Royal Regatta
People educated at Eton College
Alumni of Trinity College, Oxford
Oxford University Boat Club rowers
Rowers at the 1962 British Empire and Commonwealth Games
Commonwealth Games medallists in rowing
Commonwealth Games gold medallists for England
Commonwealth Games bronze medallists for England
High Sheriffs of Northamptonshire
European Rowing Championships medalists
Medallists at the 1962 British Empire and Commonwealth Games